Gheorghe Popescu (8 August 1919 – 1 January 2001) was a Romanian footballer and also a manager. He played as a striker.

International career
Gheorghe Popescu I played 6 friendly games at international level for Romania, making his debut under Constantin Rădulescu in a 2–1 home victory against Belgium. He scored his only goal in a 2–1 away victory against Yugoslavia. Popescu's last appearance was in a 2–2 against Slovakia.

Managerial career
Gheorghe Popescu was a successful manager, training in his career only two teams, Steaua București and Romania national football team.  After retiring as manager, he was the President of Romanian Football Federation and the vice-president of Steaua București.

Honours

Player
CCA/Steaua București
Romanian Cup (1): 1948–49

Manager
CCA/Steaua București
Romanian League (4): 1951, 1952, 1953, 1960
Romanian Cup (3): 1951, 1952, 1962

References

External links

1919 births
2001 deaths
Romanian footballers
FC Sportul Studențesc București players
FC Carmen București players
FC Steaua București players
FC Steaua București managers
Romania international footballers
Liga I players
Liga II players
Romania national football team managers
Presidents of the Romanian Football Federation
Romanian sports executives and administrators
Association football forwards
Romanian football managers